Nada Personal (Spanish for "Nothing Personal") is the second album recorded by Argentine rock band Soda Stereo, released in 1985. It was recorded at Estudios Moebio in Buenos Aires, Argentina and remastered in 2007 at Sterling Sound Studios in New York.

"Nada Personal" provided the band with at least three successful singles, which became the breakout songs for the band all over Hispano-America. The album showed Soda Stereo venturing in a new musical direction focused mainly on the British New Wave style. The most successful singles from the album were "Juegos De Seducción" (Games of Seduction/Seduction Games), "Nada Personal" (Nothing Personal) and "Cuando pase el temblor" (When the Earthquake Ends). Those songs enjoyed strong airplay during 1985 and 1986, primarily in Argentina, Mexico, Uruguay and Chile.

Such successful songs were performed live twice at the Viña del Mar International Song Festival held in Chile in February, 1987. Many people (including music journalists) consider these two shows very historic.

Background
The album was recorded and mixed at the Moebio studios in Buenos Aires (Argentina) with technician Mariano López as sound engineer.

Nada Personal also presents, in some songs, the band's intention explore new sounds, as in "Estoy Azulado", a song that begins with a climactic sax introduction by Gonzalo Palacios, and in "Cuando pase el temblor", a song that mixes rock with Andean music typical of northwestern Argentina. Without abandoning "danceable" rhythms, this second LP achieved more depth in the lyrics and maturity in the melodies.

Well received by critics, it meant a huge increase in popularity for the band. In Argentina alone, it sold around 180,000 copies in the first few months. The disc meant the definitive consecration of Soda Stereo before the Argentine public.

In June 1986, Soda Stereo decided to record a video clip of the song "Cuando pase el temblor". This is recorded in the ruins of Pucará, in Tilcara, Jujuy, under the direction of Alfredo Lois.

Gustavo Cerati comments on the album:

Promotion
During the southern summer of 1986, the group toured Argentine tourist centers to promote the album, playing in Mar del Plata, Villa Gesell and Pinamar, also adding a consecration concert at the La Falda Festival, in Córdoba, which featured the participation of Andrés Calamaro and Charly García as guest keyboardists on the song "¿Por qué no puedo ser del Jet-Set?".

In April 1986, 22,000 spectators burst through the four performances that served to officially present the album at the Obras Sanitarias Stadium in Buenos Aires. In the first of the functions, a lengthy live video was recorded. This video would be called Nada Personal en Obras and would be edited months later.

After the concerts performed at Obras, the album's sales began to grow rapidly, rising from gold (which they had achieved during the summer) to platinum, and reaching double that figure in the following months.

At the end of that same year, the band's first Latin American tour took place, covering Colombia, Ecuador, Perú, Chile, Venezuela and Paraguay.

Track listing
 Lyrics by Gustavo Cerati
 "Nada personal" (Nothing Personal) (Cerati) – 4:57
 "Si no fuera por..." (If It Wasn't For...) (Cerati / Bosio / Alberti) – 3:29
 "Cuando pase el temblor" (When the Earthquake Ends) (Cerati)– 3:48
 "Danza rota" (Broken Dance) (Cerati) – 3:35
 "El cuerpo del delito" (Corpus Delicti) (Cerati / Bosio) – 3:50
 "Juego de seducción" (Seduction Game) (Cerati) – 3:21
 "Estoy azulado" (I'm Blue) (Coleman / Cerati)  – 5:21
 "Observándonos (Satélites)" (Observing Us (Satellites)) (Cerati / Bosio) – 3:09
 "Imágenes retro" (Retro-Images) (Cerati / Alberti)  – 3:55
 "Ecos" (Echoes) (Cerati)  – 4:58

Personnel
Soda Stereo
 Gustavo Cerati – Lead Vocals, Guitars
 Zeta Bosio – Bass guitar, Backing Vocals
 Charly Alberti – Drums, Percussion

Additional personnel
 Fabian Vön Quintiero – Keyboards
 Gonzalo Palacios – Sax
 Produced by Soda Stereo

References

External links
 Official website
 Discography

Soda Stereo albums
1985 albums
CBS Records albums
Sony Music Argentina albums